The 2015–16 FC Red Bull Salzburg season was the 83rd season in club history. Red Bull Salzburg finished the season as champions of the Bundesliga and the Austrian Cup for the third season in a row. In Europe, Salzburg were knocked out of the Champions League by Malmö FF in the third qualifying round, dropping into the Europa League, where they were eliminated by Dinamo Minsk in the play-off round.

Season events

Bundesliga 
On matchday one, on 25 July, Red Bull lost 2–1 to Mattersburg. Markus Pink and Alexander Ibser scored for Mattersburg and Naby Keïta scored for Red Bull. Red Bull finished the matchday tied for seventh place. Red Bull lost 2–1 to Rapid Wien on Matchday two, on 1 August. Athanasios Petsos and Stefan Schwab scored for Rapid Wien and Dimitri Oberlin scored for Red Bull. Red Bull finished the matchday in ninth place. On matchday three, on 8 August, Red Bull and Admira Wacker finished in a 2–2 draw. Yordy Reyna and Naby Keïta scored for Red Bull and Dominik Starkl and Markus Lackner scored for Admira Wacker. Red Bull finished the matchday in seventh place.

Austrian Cup
Red Bull opened up their season on 18 July with three goals each from Jonathan Soriano and Marco Djuricin and a goal from Takumi Minamino.

Champions League
Red Bull entered the competition in the third qualifying round. They were drawn against the winner of the fixture between Malmö and Žalgiris. Malmö advanced to face Red Bull. The first leg took place on 29 July. Red Bull won 2–0 with goals from Andreas Ulmer and Martin Hinteregger. Hinteregger scored from the penalty spot. The second leg was played on 5 August. Red Bull lost 3–0 to get knocked out 3–2 on aggregate. Nikola Đurđić, Markus Rosenberg, and Vladimir Rodić scored for Malmö.

Europa League
Red Bull were knocked out of Champions League by Malmö and entered the Europa League playoff round. Red Bull were drawn against Dinamo Minsk. The first leg was played on 20 August. Dinamo Minsk won the match 2–0 with goals from Gleb Rassadkin and Nenad Adamović.

Squad

Out on loan

Left during the season

Transfers

In

Loans in

Out

Loans out

Released

Friendlies

Competitions

Overview

Bundesliga

League table

Results summary

Results by round

Results

Austrian Cup

Final

UEFA Champions League

Qualifying rounds

UEFA Europa League

Qualifying rounds

Statistics

Appearances and goals

|-
|colspan="14"|Players away on loan :

|-
|colspan="14"|Players who left Red Bull Salzburg during the season:

|}

Goal scorers

Clean sheets

Disciplinary Record

References

Red Bull Salzburg
FC Red Bull Salzburg seasons
Austrian football championship-winning seasons